WXMR-LP (94.3 FM) is a radio station licensed to serve the community of Marengo, Illinois. The station is owned by Marril Corsen Media Project, Ltd. It airs a community radio format.

The station was assigned the WXMR-LP call letters by the Federal Communications Commission on January 22, 2014.

References

External links
 Official Website
 

XMR-LP
XMR-LP
Radio stations established in 2014
2014 establishments in Illinois
Community radio stations in the United States
McHenry County, Illinois